Hockersville is an unincorporated community in Derry Township, Dauphin County, Pennsylvania, United States and is a part of the Harrisburg-Carlisle Metropolitan Statistical Area.

References

External links 
Hockersville Profile

Harrisburg–Carlisle metropolitan statistical area
Unincorporated communities in Dauphin County, Pennsylvania
Unincorporated communities in Pennsylvania